Carbery Rangers is a Gaelic football club in Rosscarbery in County Cork, Ireland.
It plays in games organised by Cork county board. It is one of the oldest clubs in Cork, having been founded in 1887. It currently competes in the Cork Senior Football Championship, and in the Carbery GAA division competitions. The club does not field any hurling teams.

History
The Carbery Rangers club was founded in 1887. The first meeting was held on 10 November 1887 in a house which stood on the site which in now the Celtic Ross Hotel.
As far as the name of the club is concerned, some of the earliest match reports give the name Carbery Rangers or in some cases Rosscarbery Rangers. This title was changed briefly in 1890 to the name Michael Dwyer in response to a request that all clubs should adopt patriotic names. As to why the name Carbery Rangers was chosen in the beginning we just don't know, but it can be assumed that it had connotations of athletic ability, durability, and fearlessness in the Rangers part of the title and the Carbery part obviously came from the title of the local barony. The colours of the club at the beginning would seem to have been green and gold, as a report on a monster meeting held in Ross early in 1888, refers to the members of the newly formed GAA club being dressed in their "orange & green" uniforms. The present colours of the Carbery Rangers are green, white, & yellow hoops, a design that dates back to the time when the club was reorganised in 1900.

The first match played by the club under Gaelic Athletic Association rules was on 4 December 1887 in a field, which was part of the lands of Downeen Castle. The field was situated a good distance from Ross but it did not deter a huge throng of people from attending the match. Up to 4,000 people are said to have witnessed the game against (O' Briens) Skibbereen, which resulted in a win for the Rangers. The first championship won was the West Cork senior football championship in 1906. The team reached the Cork Senior Football Championship final but lost to Fermoy. The club won its first Senior County title in 2016 by beating Ballincollig in the final. The club progressed to the Munster Senior Club Football Championship whereupon they were defeated by The Nire of Waterford in the semi-final.

Honours
 Cork Senior Football Championship: Winners (1) 2016, Runners-Up 1905, 1906, 2014
 Kelleher Shield (Senior Football League) Winners (3) 2009, 2011, 2014  Runners-Up 2013
 All Ireland Scór na nÓg Ballad Group Champions - 2018
 All Ireland Scór Sinsir Ballad Group Champions - 2018
 All-Ireland Intermediate Club Football Championship Winners (1) 2005
 Munster Intermediate Club Football Championship Winners (2) 2004, 2005
 Cork Intermediate Football Championship: Winners (1) 2005, Runners-Up 2004
 All-Ireland Junior Club Football Championship Runners-Up 2004
 Munster Junior Club Football Championship Winners (1) 2003
 Cork Junior Football Championship: Winners (1) 2003, Runners-Up 1939, 1987
 Cork Minor Football Championship: Runners Up 1955,
 West Cork Junior A Football Championship: Winners (10) 1937, 1938, 1939, 1940, 1980, 1984, 1987, 1991, 1998, 2003. Runners-Up: 1942, 1943, 1945, 1946, 1955, 1956, 1973, 1975, 1978, 1992, 1995, 1996, 1999, 2000
 West Cork Junior B Football Championship: Winners (1) 1954
 West Cork Junior B Hurling Championship: Winners (1) 1942 Runners Up 1962, 1963
 West Cork Junior C Football Championship: Winners (5) 1991, 1994, 1995, 1997, 2001, Runners Up 1981, 1989, 1993, 2003
 West Cork Junior D Football Championship: Winners (2) 2004, 2019
 West Cork Minor A Football Championship: Winners (3) 1955, 1956, 1992, 2006, Runners Up 1993, 2003, 2006
 West Cork Minor B Hurling Championship: Runners Up 1973, 1975
 West Cork Minor B Football Championship: Winners (8) 1966, 1967, 1968, 1972, 1975, 1979, 1990, 2005, Runners Up: 1970, 1971, 1973, 1976, 1989
 West Cork Under-21 Football Championship: Winners (1) 1995 Runners-Up: 1981, 1992
 West Cork Under-21 C Hurling Championship: Winners (1) 2012
 West Cork Under-14 Premier Championship: Winners (1) 2005

Notable players
 Kevin McMahon
 Robbie Kiely
 John O'Rourke
 John Hayes

References

External links
Official Carbery Rangers Club website

Gaelic games clubs in County Cork
Gaelic football clubs in County Cork
Rosscarbery